Child's Ercall s a civil parish in Shropshire, England.  It contains nine listed buildings that are recorded in the National Heritage List for England.  Of these, one is listed at Grade II*, the middle of the three grades, and the others are at Grade II, the lowest grade.  The parish contains the villages of Child's Ercall and Tibberton, and is otherwise rural.  The listed buildings consist of a church and items in the churchyard, houses, farmhouses, farm buildings, and a bridge.


Key

Buildings

References

Citations

Sources

Lists of buildings and structures in Shropshire